Mark Allan Takano (born December 10, 1960) is an American politician and academic who has served in the United States House of Representatives since 2013, representing California's 41st congressional district from 2013 to 2023, and the state's 39th congressional district since 2023. A member of the Democratic Party, Takano became the first openly gay person of Asian descent in Congress upon taking office.

Early life, education, and academic career
Takano was born in 1960 in Riverside, California. His family was relocated and interned from California to a "War Relocation Camp" during World War II. He is Sansei, that is, the grandson of people born in Japan who immigrated to the United States. He attended La Sierra High School in the Alvord Unified School District, where he graduated as class valedictorian. In high school, he also participated in the Junior State of America, a national student-run organization centered around debate and civic engagement in young people, and was elected lieutenant governor of the Southern California State. He graduated from Harvard University with an AB in government in 1983 and from the University of California, Riverside with an MFA in creative writing for the performing arts in 2010.

Takano taught British literature in public schools for 23 years. He was a member of the Republican Party through college, when he became a member of the Democratic Party. In 1990 he was elected to the Riverside Community College Board of Trustees. While on the board, he shepherded a measure that gave college employees domestic partner benefits.

U.S. House of Representatives

Elections

1992

Takano ran for the United States House of Representatives in California's 43rd congressional district. He won a seven-candidate Democratic primary with 29% of the vote. Republican Ken Calvert defeated Takano by 519 votes, 47%–46%.

1994

Takano defeated Raven Lopez Workman in the Democratic primary, 70%–30%. During the campaign, Republican State Assemblyman Ray Haynes outed Takano, calling him a "homosexual liberal". In the general election, Calvert defeated Takano, 55%–38%.

2012

In July 2011, Takano announced he would run for the House in the newly redrawn 41st congressional district, established in the redistricting following the 2010 United States Census. Five candidates ran for the open seat. In the June 2012 open primary, John Tavaglione, a Republican who sat on the Riverside County Board of Supervisors, ranked first with 45% of the votes. Takano ranked second with 37%. In the November general election, Takano defeated Tavaglione, 58%–42%. Takano became the first openly gay non-white member of the House.

Committee assignments
Committee on Veterans' Affairs (Ranking Member)
Committee on Education and Labor
Subcommittee on Higher Education and Workforce Training
Subcommittee on Workforce Protections

Caucus memberships
Congressional LGBTQ+ Equality Caucus (co-chair)
Congressional Progressive Caucus
Medicare for All Caucus
Congressional Energy Storage Caucus (co-chair)
After Corrine Brown's indictment on July 8, 2016, she temporarily stepped down as ranking member of the Veterans Committee, leaving Takano as acting ranking member until the end of the 114th Congress. When the Democrats took the House majority after the 2018 elections, Takano became the chair of the committee.

Tenure
When Representative Bill Cassidy circulated a draft letter opposing an immigration reform bill in 2013, asking for signatures, Takano marked it up in red pen like a high school assignment and gave it an F, with comments like, "exaggeration – avoid hyperbole."

Takano co-chairs the Congressional LGBT Equality Caucus and is a member of the Congressional Progressive Caucus, the Congressional Arts Caucus, the Congressional Asian Pacific American Caucus, the United States Congressional International Conservation Caucus, U.S.-Japan Caucus, and the Advanced Energy Storage Caucus.

For his tenure as the chairman of the House Veterans' Affairs Committee in the 116th Congress, Takano earned an "A" grade from the nonpartisan Lugar Center's Congressional Oversight Hearing Index.

Political positions

Abortion
As of 2022, Takano has a 100% rating from NARAL Pro-Choice America and an F rating from the Susan B. Anthony List for his abortion-related voting record. He opposed the overturning of Roe v. Wade, calling it "offensive and radical".

Donald Trump
Takano supported both impeachments of Donald Trump.

Gun control
Takano supports gun control efforts. In the wake of the 2015 San Bernardino attack, he criticized Congress for its inability to pass gun control laws, describing the shooting in San Bernardino as "the cost of inaction."

2020 presidential election 
Takano endorsed Bernie Sanders in the presidential primary election, saying Sanders "has a bold vision" and "can get things done". After Sanders dropped out of the primaries, Takano endorsed Democratic nominee Joe Biden.

Personal life

Takano gardens and cooks. Every year, he gathers with his family in Riverside to make a large batch of teriyaki sauce using the family recipe.

See also
List of Asian Americans and Pacific Islands Americans in the United States Congress
List of LGBT members of the United States Congress

References

External links

Congressman Mark Takano official U.S. House website
Mark Takano for Congress campaign website 
 
 

|-

|-

|-

1960 births
20th-century American educators
20th-century American politicians
21st-century American politicians
American politicians of Japanese descent
California politicians of Japanese descent
Candidates in the 1992 United States elections
Candidates in the 1994 United States elections
Gay politicians
Educators from Greater Los Angeles
Harvard University alumni
La Sierra High School alumni
American LGBT people of Asian descent
LGBT members of the United States Congress
LGBT people from California
Living people
Members of the United States Congress of Japanese descent
Democratic Party members of the United States House of Representatives from California
Asian-American members of the United States House of Representatives
People from Riverside, California